Coatsworth is a surname. Notable people with the surname include:

Elizabeth Coatsworth (1893–1986), American author of children's fiction and poetry
Emerson Coatsworth (1854–1943), Canadian lawyer and politician
Gary Coatsworth (born 1968), English former footballer
John Henry Coatsworth (born 1940), historian of Latin America and the provost of Columbia University
Leonard Coatsworth, the last person to drive on the Tacoma Narrows Bridge (1940) before its collapse
Lucien Coatsworth Gause (1836–1880), nineteenth century politician and lawyer from Arkansas
Moira Coatsworth (born 1953), President of the New Zealand Labour Party

See also
Chatsworth (disambiguation)
Cotsworth (disambiguation)